David Švagrovský (born December 21, 1984) is a Czech former professional ice hockey player. He most notably played in the Czech Extraliga (ELH).

Playing career
He was selected by the Colorado Avalanche in the 4th round (131st overall) of the 2003 NHL Entry Draft from the major junior club, the Seattle Thunderbirds of the Western Hockey League. Švagrovský played his first three professional seasons with Avalanche affiliates in the North American minor leagues, before returning to the Czech Republic for the majority of his playing career.

Švagrovský played with HC Slavia Praha in the Czech Extraliga during the 2010–11 Czech Extraliga season.

On May 11, 2012, in need of a new challenge after four seasons with HC Berounští Medvědi, Švagrovský signed a two-year contract to remain in the Czech first division with rivals HC Hradec Králové.

After the completion of the 2016–17 season with HC Litoměřice, Švagrovský ended his 13-year professional career, accepting a scouting position on August 28, 2017.

Career statistics

References

External links

1984 births
Albany River Rats players
Arizona Sundogs players
Czech ice hockey forwards
Colorado Avalanche draft picks
Colorado Eagles players
HC Kometa Brno players
Living people
Lowell Lock Monsters players
HC Dynamo Pardubice players
San Diego Gulls (ECHL) players
Seattle Thunderbirds players
HC Slavia Praha players
HC Sparta Praha players
Ice hockey people from Prague
Czech expatriate ice hockey players in the United States
Stadion Hradec Králové players